The artistic roller skating tournaments at the 2017 World Games in Wrocław was played between 22 and 23 July. 38 artistic roller skating competitors, from 11 nations, participated in the tournament. The acrobatic gymnastics competition took place at Świdnica Icerink in Świdnica.

Qualification

Summary

Schedule
All time are Central European Summer Time (UTC+02:00)

Participating nations
The 38 artistic roller skating competitors, from 11 nations, participated in the tournament. The host country, Poland did not participate in this sport.

Medal table

Medalists

References

External links
 Fédération Internationale Roller Sports
 Roller sports on IWGA website
 Schedule
 Entry list
 Medalists
 Medals standing
 Results book

 
2017 World Games
2017
2017 in roller sports